Jonathan Legard (born 7 July 1961 in Cardiff, Wales), is a sports journalist, best known as the lead commentator for the BBC's Formula One TV coverage in 2009 and 2010.

Legard has been the BBC's motor racing and football correspondent as well as commentating regularly on Formula One races for BBC Radio 5 Live from 1997 to 2004. On 24 November 2008, he was confirmed as the lead commentator for the BBC's Formula One coverage in 2009. On 11 January 2011, the BBC announced changes in the F1 commentary team.
On Twitter, Legard confirmed to British F1 fans that he would not be commentating on BBC F1 coverage during the forthcoming season.

On 19 January 2011 Legard became a sports presenter on BBC Radio 4's Today programme. In February 2011 Legard began commentating on football in BBC's The Football League Show. He has served as the Olympic Broadcasting Services English-language commentator for volleyball since the 2012 Summer Olympics.

Career
1987–1990: BBC Radio Merseyside
1990–1997: BBC Radio 5 Live
1997–2004: Motor racing correspondent for BBC Radio 5 Live
2004–2008: Football correspondent for BBC Radio 5 Live
2009–2010: Formula One commentator for BBC Television
2011–: Sports correspondent for BBC Radio 4's Today programme and Football correspondent for BBC Radio 5 Live
2011–: Sports news presenter BBC News and BBC World News
2011–2015: Commentator on BBC One's The Football League Show
2012–: Relief Formula One commentator for BBC
2012: Volleyball commentator for BBC at the 2012 Summer Olympics
2013: DTM highlights commentator for ITV4
2014–: Red Bull Air Race
2016: Rio Olympics commentator

Personal life

Although born in Cardiff, Legard grew up in Chester after moving there in 1966. He attended the Firs School before continuing his education at a private school in Shrewsbury. Legard is a lifelong fan of Chester City F.C. who until 2010 played their football in the Football Conference. Legard is married and has three children and lives in Acton, London.

References

External links 

BBC Profile
BBC announces Formula One presentation team
BBC's Formula 1 team

1961 births
Living people
Motorsport announcers
Formula One journalists and reporters
British sports broadcasters
Journalists from Cardiff
People from Chester